Chintsa, alternatively rendered Cintsa, is a village in the Wild Coast region of the Eastern Cape province, South Africa. It is situated 38 km north-east from East London and 10 km north from Gonubie, at the mouth of the Chintsa River.

There are two resort areas catering to tourists interested in sea fishing to the east and west of the river.

The village is in Xhosa country. It has a laid-back atmosphere with low-cost accommodation and unspoilt white sand beaches in Chintsa East, backed by forested dunes, lagoons and rivers.

References

Populated places in the Great Kei Local Municipality
Populated coastal places in South Africa